The Summer Collection is a compilation album by Donna Summer released in 1985 by Mercury Records. Summer had made her name during the era of disco music in the 1970s when she was signed to Casablanca Records. In 1980, she signed to Geffen Records but her success there was not what it had been on Casablanca. In the early 1980s, Casablanca was bought out entirely by Polygram Records, and Summer had returned to them for one studio album. Mercury, another division of Polygram and a sister company to Casablanca, released that album entitled She Works Hard for the Money in 1983. It also released this compilation album in 1985, containing seven of her original disco hits from Casablanca, plus three songs from the aforementioned Mercury Records album.

Track listing

References

Albums produced by Pete Bellotte
Albums produced by Giorgio Moroder
Albums produced by Michael Omartian
1985 greatest hits albums
Donna Summer compilation albums
Mercury Records compilation albums